Yupi may refer to:

 Yupi, an Internet portal founded in 1997
 Yupi (confectioner), an Indonesian gummy lolly manufacturer
 Yupi Tartars, an old name for the Nanai people and related ethnic groups of the Amur River basin